Crosa may refer to:

People
 Diego Crosa (born 1976), Argentinian football player
 Fernando Crosa (born 1979), Argentinian football player
 Giacomo Crosa (born 1947), Italian journalist and high jumper
 Liliane Crosa (born 1942), Swiss figure skater

Places
 Crosa, Piedmont, Italy
 Lago della Crosa, Switzerland

Other
 Crosa (fly), genus of tilt-legged flies

See also